Mariano Elí Acevedo Fúnez (born 9 January 1983) is a Honduran footballer who currently plays as a midfielder for Marathón in the Honduran Premier League.

Club career
Acevedo has played the large part of his career for Marathón, and is a midfielder. He has played for Marathón in the CONCACAF Champions League. In May 2013 he did not accept a pay cut by Marathón and was said to move to either Olimpia or Motagua.

International career
Acevedo made his debut for Honduras in a February 2008 friendly match against Paraguay, coming on as a second-half substitute for Sergio Mendoza. He has, as of 1 August 2012, earned a total of 18 caps, scoring no goals. He has represented his country at the 2009, and 2011 UNCAF Nations Cups as well as at the 2009 CONCACAF Gold Cup.

CONCACAF Champions League

Honours and awards

Country
Honduras
Copa Centroamericana (1): 2011

References

External links 

1983 births
Living people
People from Yoro Department
Association football midfielders
Honduran footballers
Honduran expatriate footballers
Honduras international footballers
2009 UNCAF Nations Cup players
2009 CONCACAF Gold Cup players
2011 Copa Centroamericana players
C.D. Marathón players
C.D. Olimpia players
C.D. Honduras Progreso players
Deportes Concepción (Chile) footballers
Primera B de Chile players
Expatriate footballers in Chile
Liga Nacional de Fútbol Profesional de Honduras players
Copa Centroamericana-winning players